Intermedia was the third notable hypertext project to emerge from Brown University, after HES (1967) and FRESS (1969). Intermedia was started in 1985 by Norman Meyrowitz, who had been associated with earlier hypertext research at Brown. The Intermedia project coincided with the establishment of the Institute for Research in Information and Scholarship (IRIS).  Some of the materials that came from Intermedia, authored by Meyrowitz, Nancy Garrett, and Karen Catlin were used in the development of HTML.

Intermedia ran on A/UX version 1.1. Intermedia was programmed using an object-oriented toolkit and standard DBMS functions. Intermedia supported bi-directional, dual-anchor links for both text and graphics. Small icons are used as anchor markers. Intermedia properties include author, creation date, title, and keywords. Link information is stored by the system apart from the source text. More than one such set of data can be kept, which allows each user to have their own "web" of information. Intermedia has complete multi-user support, with three levels of access rights: read, write, and annotate, which is similar to Unix permissions.

As promising as Intermedia was, it used a lot of resources for its time (it required 4 MB of RAM and 80 MB of hard drive space in 1989). It was also highly tied to A/UX, a less popular Unix-like operating system that ran on Apple Macintosh computers; thus, it wasn't very portable. In 1991, changes in A/UX and lack of funding ended the Intermedia project.

See also 
 Xanadu
 Microcosm
 Hyper-G (or HyperWave)

References 
 L. Nancy Garrett and Karen E. Smith. "Building a Timeline Editor from Prefab Parts: The Architecture of an Object-Oriented Application". ACM Proceedings of OOPSLA ’86 (September 1986).
 L. Nancy Garrett, Norman Meyrowitz, and Karen E. Smith. "Intermedia: Issues, Strategies, and Tactics in the Design of a Hypermedia System". ACM Proceedings of the Conference on Computer-Supported Cooperative Work (December 1986).
 Nicole Yankelovich, Karen E. Smith, L. Nancy Garrett and Norman Meyrowitz. "Issues in Designing a Hypermedia Document System: The Intermedia Case Study" in Learning Tomorrow: Journal of the Apple Education Advisory Council, n3 p35-87 Spring 1987.
 Karen E. Smith and Stanley B. Zdonik. "Intermedia: A case study of the differences between relational and object-oriented database systems". ACM SIGPLAN Notices, Volume 22,  Issue 12  (December 1987) Pages: 452 - 465.
 L. Nancy Garrett, Julie Launhardt, and Karen Smith Catlin. "Hypermedia Templates: An Author’s Tool". ACM Proceedings of Hypertext ‘91 (December 1991).
 Paul Kahn. "Linking Together Books: Experiments in Adapting Published Materials into Intermedia Documents " in Hypermedia and Literary Studies, Paul Delany and George P. Landow (editors).  The MIT Press (March 19, 1994) 
 The History of Hypertext by Jacob Nielsen (February 1, 1995), https://www.nngroup.com/articles/hypertext-history/ (accessed 1/31/2017)
 Brown University Department of Computer Science. (May 23, 2019). A Half-Century of Hypertext at Brown: A Symposium.
Hypertext
Hypermedia
Computer-related introductions in 1985

External links 
  Video of Norman Meyrowitz demonstrating Intermedia at ACM HUMAN’20 conference, Dec 2020